Terri Leslie Garber (born December 28, 1960) is an American actress and entrepreneur.

Career
Garber's acting debut was as Allison Linden on the daytime soap opera Texas in 1982. Her first feature film role in the 1984 action film Toy Soldiers.

Garber's breakout role was wicked Southern belle Ashton Main in the 1985 ABC miniseries North and South, based on the 1982 novel of the same name by John Jakes. As of 2002, it was still ranked among the ten highest rated miniseries in TV history. Garber reprised the role for the 1986 sequel miniseries, North and South: Book II, as well as for the 1994 final installment, Heaven and Hell: North and South Book III. In 1987, she described Ashton:

Garber portrayed the role of Leslie Carrington on the primetime soap Dynasty from 1987–88. She appeared alone on the cover of TV Guide for the September 5, 1987 issue (#1797), which included an interview with her. After Dynasty, Garber made guest appearances in various series including Quantum Leap, Murder She Wrote, and Midnight Caller, and appeared in the Australian film Beyond My Reach (1990). In the 1990s, she landed roles in two daytime soap operas: Suzanne Collier on Santa Barbara from 1991–92 and Victoria Parker on General Hospital in 1993. Garber later portrayed the recurring role of Iris Dumbrowski on the daytime soap opera As the World Turns in 2005, returning from November 2006-10.

In 2012, Garber appeared as Elizabeth Archer in the series finale of the teen drama web series Miss Behave. She later won a 2013 Indie Soap Award for Best Guest Appearance in a Drama for the performance.

In 2013, Garber played a therapist on the web series Old Dogs & New Tricks (Season 2, Episode 10: "Last Gasps").

Personal life
Garber grew up in Miami, the youngest of three children of a lawyer father and a cooking-school owner mother. She did some modeling from ages 4 to 13, and always wanted to be a performer. Garber told TV Guide in 1987 that she chose acting over singing because "I was too nervous to sing in front of people—it meant showing more of myself than acting. If you're on stage singing and people don't like it, that's too much rejection." She later moved to New York, where her casual drug use became what she called "a huge problem". She overcame the addiction before being cast in North and South.

Garber met her first husband, screenwriter Christopher "Chris" Hager, when he was working as a grip on the set of North and South: Book II in 1985. She and Hager are the parents of actress and singer Molly E. Hager (b. 1986). That union ended in divorce in 1989. Her second marriage, to Frank Michael Howson (July 21, 2001 – June 24, 2002), also ended in divorce. In 2013, Garber married director William Roudebush, her former high school drama teacher that she had once been engaged to when she was age 17.

Garber and her sister Lisa Garber Rubenstein began a business handmaking all-natural soap in various scents and styles, known as SistersAlchemy.

Filmography

Film

Television

References

External links
 

1960 births
Living people
American television actresses
American soap opera actresses
Actresses from Miami
21st-century American women